Jesse C. Carson High School (often referred to as Carson High School or Carson) is a public, co-educational secondary school located in China Grove, NC. It is one of seven high schools in the Rowan-Salisbury School System.

History
Jesse C. Carson High School opened in 2006, drawing students from four other high schools in Rowan County. It is named for former Rowan County School System Superintendent Jesse C. Carson.

Academics
Jesse C. Carson High School is consistently rated as "B" school by the NC Department of Public Instruction. Carson features an Academy of the Arts with concentrations in visual arts, dance, theater, choral and instrumental music.  Carson also offers unique Project Lead the Way coursework in Biomedical Science and Engineering.

Athletics
Jesse C. Carson High School is a 3A school in the South Piedmont Conference. Carson Women's Basketball won the school's first state championship in 2021.

External links

References

Public high schools in North Carolina
Educational institutions established in 2006
Schools in Rowan County, North Carolina
2006 establishments in North Carolina